De ortolaan is a novel by Dutch author Maarten 't Hart. It was first published in 1984.

Novels by Maarten 't Hart
1984 novels